The 2000 World Outdoor Bowls Championship women's pairs was held in Moama, Australia, from 8 to 25 March 2000.

The gold medal was won by Margaret Letham & Joyce Lindores of Scotland.

Section tables

Section A

Section B

Bronze medal match
 England bt  Papua New Guinea 21-17

Gold medal match
 Scotland bt  Australia 17-13

References

Wor
Wom
Bow